The 67th Street station was a local station on the demolished IRT Third Avenue Line in Manhattan, New York City. It had two tracks and two side platforms. 67th Street station opened on September 16, 1878  by the New York Elevated Railway Company, and was the terminus of the IRT Third Avenue Line until it was expanded to 89th Street on December 9, 1878. This station closed on May 12, 1955, with the ending of all service on the Third Avenue El south of 149th Street.

References

External links
http://www.nycsubway.org/lines/3rdave-el.html
https://web.archive.org/web/20100609061601/http://www.stationreporter.net/3avl.htm

IRT Third Avenue Line stations
Railway stations closed in 1955
1878 establishments in New York (state)
1955 disestablishments in New York (state)
Former elevated and subway stations in Manhattan

Third Avenue